Trenton Friends Meeting House is a historic Quaker meeting house at 142 E. Hanover Street in Trenton, Mercer County, New Jersey, United States.

The Trenton Quaker Meeting House dates back to 1739.  It was occupied by the British Dragoons in 1776, and by the Continental Army later in the Revolutionary War.  It has been in continuous use by Quakers in and around Trenton ever since it was built. It was added to the National Register of Historic Places in 2008.

See also
National Register of Historic Places listings in Mercer County, New Jersey

References

Churches in Trenton, New Jersey
National Register of Historic Places in Trenton, New Jersey
Churches on the National Register of Historic Places in New Jersey
Quaker meeting houses in New Jersey
Churches completed in 1739
18th-century Quaker meeting houses
1739 establishments in New Jersey